Ram Avtar was a character actor turned comedian in Hindi  cinema. He is best known for his roles in Nasir Hussain's films, especially Teesri Manzil  (1967) and Yaadon Ki Baaraat (1973). These roles ranged from tickled train passenger in the former to the hero's sidekick in Jab Pyar Kisi Se Hota Hai (1961) and Tumsa Nahin Dekha (1957). He was known for his big stomach and mirthful demeanor.

Avtar began his career in the late-1930s and early 1940s, as a character actor. Over the 1950s he transitioned into a comedian as he began to put on more weight. Avtar's last film credit was in 1981.

Filmography

External links
 

Indian male film actors
Male actors in Hindi cinema
Indian male comedians
Possibly living people
Year of birth missing
20th-century Indian male actors